This is a list of 245 species in Dohrniphora, a genus of scuttle flies in the family Phoridae.

Dohrniphora species

 Dohrniphora adriani Disney, 1983 c g
 Dohrniphora adusta Borgmeier, 1925 c g
 Dohrniphora aequidistans Brunetti, 1912 c g
 Dohrniphora alvarengai Prado, 1976 c g
 Dohrniphora anchicayensis Brown & Kung, 2007 c g
 Dohrniphora andersoni Disney, 1990 c g
 Dohrniphora angolensis Beyer, 1959 c g
 Dohrniphora angularis Borgmeier & Prado, 1975 c g
 Dohrniphora anterosetalis Borgmeier & Prado, 1975 c g
 Dohrniphora anterospinalis Borgmeier, 1923 c g
 Dohrniphora anteroventralis Borgmeier, 1960 c g
 Dohrniphora apharea Kung & Brown, 2005 c g
 Dohrniphora apicinebula Beyer, 1958 c g
 Dohrniphora arcuata Brown & Kung, 2007 c g
 Dohrniphora aseta Disney, 2003 c g
 Dohrniphora aspinula  g
 Dohrniphora aterpaolii Disney, 2006 c g
 Dohrniphora atratula Malloch, 1925 c g
 Dohrniphora awarensis Disney, 1990 c g
 Dohrniphora barroni Disney, 1990 c g
 Dohrniphora beaveri Disney, 1990 c g
 Dohrniphora belyaevae Mostovski, 2000 c g
 Dohrniphora bicostula Kung & Brown, 2005 c g
 Dohrniphora bilineata Borgmeier, 1961 c g
 Dohrniphora binga Disney, 1991 c g
 Dohrniphora biseriata Borgmeier, 1960 c g
 Dohrniphora bisetalis Borgmeier, 1923 c g
 Dohrniphora bispinosa Borgmeier & Prado, 1975 c g
 Dohrniphora bradburyi Disney, 1990 c g
 Dohrniphora brasiliensis Borgmeier, 1922 c g
 Dohrniphora broadheadi Disney, 1983 c g
 Dohrniphora brunnea Borgmeier, 1960 c g
 Dohrniphora brunneifrons Brown & Kung, 2007 c g
 Dohrniphora buscki Malloch, 1912 c g
 Dohrniphora caini Disney, 1990 c g
 Dohrniphora calvaria Borgmeier & Prado, 1975 c g
 Dohrniphora cambuquira Borgmeier, 1960 c g
 Dohrniphora canaliculata Borgmeier, 1960 c g
 Dohrniphora capillaris  g
 Dohrniphora carinata  g
 Dohrniphora castaneicoxa Borgmeier, 1960 i c g
 Dohrniphora caverna Disney, 1995 c g
 Dohrniphora cavifemur Borgmeier, 1969 c g
 Dohrniphora cerdai Brown & Kung, 2007 c g
 Dohrniphora cespitula  g
 Dohrniphora circularis Brown & Kung, 2007 c g
 Dohrniphora circumflexa Borgmeier, 1960 c g
 Dohrniphora clariloba Brown & Kung, 2007 c g
 Dohrniphora cocaensis Brown & Kung, 2007 c g
 Dohrniphora cognata Borgmeier, 1960 c g
 Dohrniphora comptoni Disney, 1990 c g
 Dohrniphora confusa Disney, 2003 c g
 Dohrniphora conica Borgmeier, 1960 c g
 Dohrniphora conlanorum Kung & Brown, 2005 c g
 Dohrniphora consimilis Brown & Kung, 2007 c g
 Dohrniphora cootei Brown & Kung, 2007 c g
 Dohrniphora cornuta (Bigot, 1857) i c g
 Dohrniphora correlata Borgmeier, 1932 c g
 Dohrniphora curticerca Brown & Kung, 2007 c g
 Dohrniphora curvispinosa Borgmeier, 1923 c g
 Dohrniphora decrescens Brown & Kung, 2007 c g
 Dohrniphora densilinearis Yang & Liu g
 Dohrniphora denticulata Borgmeier, 1960 c g
 Dohrniphora dentifemur Brown & Kung, 2007 c g
 Dohrniphora dentiretusa  g
 Dohrniphora diaspora Brown & Kung, 2007 c g
 Dohrniphora didyma Brown & Kung, 2007 c g
 Dohrniphora digitata Brown & Kung, 2007 c g
 Dohrniphora dilatata  g
 Dohrniphora diminuens (Schmitz, 1935) c g
 Dohrniphora diplocantha Borgmeier, 1960 c g
 Dohrniphora disneyi Mostovski, 2000 c g
 Dohrniphora dispar Enderlein, 1912 c g
 Dohrniphora disparilis  g
 Dohrniphora divaricata (Aldrich, 1896) i c g
 Dohrniphora dohrni Dahl, 1898 c g
 Dohrniphora ecitophila Borgmeier, 1960 c g
 Dohrniphora eilogoensis Disney, 1990 c g
 Dohrniphora eminens Borgmeier, 1960 c g
 Dohrniphora emmesta Brown & Kung, 2007 c g
 Dohrniphora erugata Brown & Kung, 2007 c g
 Dohrniphora feeneri Brown & Kung, 2007 c g
 Dohrniphora femoralis Borgmeier, 1960 c g
 Dohrniphora fijiensis Disney, 1990 c g
 Dohrniphora filaris Borgmeier & Prado, 1975 c g
 Dohrniphora fisheri Disney, 1990 c g
 Dohrniphora foveolata Borgmeier, 1960 c g
 Dohrniphora fraudans (Beyer, 1959) c g
 Dohrniphora fuscicoxa Borgmeier, 1923 c g
 Dohrniphora gaimarii Brown & Kung, 2007 c g
 Dohrniphora geetae (Disney, 2001) c g
 Dohrniphora georgei Disney, 1990 c g
 Dohrniphora gigantea Enderlein, 1924 c g
 Dohrniphora gilberti Disney, 1990 c g
 Dohrniphora goodwini Disney, 1990 c g
 Dohrniphora gouteuxi Disney, 2003 c g
 Dohrniphora gravis Borgmeier & Prado, 1975 c g
 Dohrniphora greeni Disney, 2005 c g
 Dohrniphora grootaerti Disney, 1990 c g
 Dohrniphora hamartia Brown & Kung, 2007 c g
 Dohrniphora hararensis Disney, 2003 c g
 Dohrniphora harteni Disney, 2003 c g
 Dohrniphora harveyi Disney, 1990 c g
 Dohrniphora heptacantha Borgmeier, 1923 c g
 Dohrniphora hostilis Borgmeier & Prado, 1975 c g
 Dohrniphora ignobilis Borgmeier, 1960 c g
 Dohrniphora incisuralis (Loew, 1896) i c g b
 Dohrniphora incomitata Brown & Kung, 2007 c g
 Dohrniphora indiae Disney, 2001 c g
 Dohrniphora infrequens  g
 Dohrniphora inornata Brown & Kung, 2007 c g
 Dohrniphora insulana Liu, 2001 c g
 Dohrniphora intrusa Borgmeier, 1923 c g
 Dohrniphora intumescens Liu, 2001 c g
 Dohrniphora inutilis Borgmeier & Prado, 1975 c g
 Dohrniphora irawanensis Disney, 1990 c g
 Dohrniphora irregularis Borgmeier & Prado, 1975 c g
 Dohrniphora ismayi Disney, 1990 c g
 Dohrniphora isopterorum Disney & Darlington, 2000 c g
 Dohrniphora ivoriensis Disney, 2003 c g
 Dohrniphora kalyakini Mostovski, 2000 c g
 Dohrniphora kistneri Disney, 1990 c g
 Dohrniphora kleini Brown & Kung, 2007 c g
 Dohrniphora knabi Malloch, 1912 c g
 Dohrniphora koehleri Brown & Kung, 2007 c g
 Dohrniphora lacunosa Brown & Kung, 2007 c g
 Dohrniphora lamella Borgmeier & Prado, 1975 c g
 Dohrniphora lamellifera Borgmeier, 1961 c g
 Dohrniphora leei Disney, 2005 c g
 Dohrniphora lobata Borgmeier, 1960 c g
 Dohrniphora longirostrata (Enderlein, 1912) c g
 Dohrniphora longisetalis  g
 Dohrniphora lugens Borgmeier, 1960 c g
 Dohrniphora luteicincta Borgmeier, 1960 c g
 Dohrniphora luteifrons Borgmeier, 1923 c g
 Dohrniphora maculipes Borgmeier, 1925 c g
 Dohrniphora maddisoni Disney, 1990 c g
 Dohrniphora malawiensis Disney, 2003 c g
 Dohrniphora malaysiae Green, 1997 c g
 Dohrniphora membranea Brown & Kung, 2007 c g
 Dohrniphora meridionalis Brues, 1911 c g
 Dohrniphora mesofemoralis Brown & Kung, 2007 c g
 Dohrniphora metatarsalis Borgmeier & Prado, 1975 c g
 Dohrniphora microlobata Brown & Kung, 2007 c g
 Dohrniphora microtrichina  g
 Dohrniphora minerva Borgmeier, 1961 c g
 Dohrniphora mississippiensis Khalaf, 1971 i c g
 Dohrniphora modesta Disney & Mikhailovskaya, 2000 c g
 Dohrniphora monochaeta Borgmeier, 1961 c g
 Dohrniphora montana Disney, 2003 c g
 Dohrniphora monticola Borgmeier, 1925 c g
 Dohrniphora morio Schmitz, 1927 c g
 Dohrniphora myersi Brues, 1932 c g
 Dohrniphora nepalensis Borgmeier, 1961 c g
 Dohrniphora nigra Borgmeier & Prado, 1975 c g
 Dohrniphora nitida Malloch, 1912 c g
 Dohrniphora obscuriventris Borgmeier, 1925 c g
 Dohrniphora oricilla Kung & Brown, 2005 c g
 Dohrniphora orientalis Schiner, 1868 c g
 Dohrniphora ovibarba Brown & Kung, 2007 c g
 Dohrniphora palawanensis Disney, 1990 c g
 Dohrniphora pallidens Borgmeier & Prado, 1975 c g
 Dohrniphora palpalis Borgmeier, 1961 c g
 Dohrniphora paolii Schmitz, 1928 c g
 Dohrniphora papei Brown & Kung, 2007 c g
 Dohrniphora papuana Brues, 1905 c g
 Dohrniphora paraguayana Brues, 1907 c g
 Dohrniphora paralobata Brown & Kung, 2007 c g
 Dohrniphora parvidentata Brown & Kung, 2007 c g
 Dohrniphora patawaensis Brown & Kung, 2007 c g
 Dohrniphora penai Brown & Kung, 2007 c g
 Dohrniphora penicillata Borgmeier, 1960 c g
 Dohrniphora perdita Borgmeier & Prado, 1975 c g
 Dohrniphora perpendicularis Kung & Brown, 2005 c g
 Dohrniphora perplexa (Brues, 1903) i c g
 Dohrniphora pickeringi Brown & Kung, 2007 c g
 Dohrniphora pirirostris Borgmeier, 1960 c g
 Dohrniphora plaumanni Borgmeier, 1960 c g
 Dohrniphora polleti Brown & Kung, 2007 c g
 Dohrniphora polyspinosa Disney, 1990 c g
 Dohrniphora praedator Borgmeier & Prado, 1975 c g
 Dohrniphora prescherweberae Liu, 2001 c g
 Dohrniphora proboliana Brown & Kung, 2007 c g
 Dohrniphora procera Borgmeier, 1960 c g
 Dohrniphora projecta Disney, 1990 c g
 Dohrniphora protensa Brown, 2008 c g
 Dohrniphora proxima  g
 Dohrniphora pyricornis Brues, 1944 c g
 Dohrniphora qinnica Liu, 2001 c g
 Dohrniphora rachelae Disney, 1983 c g
 Dohrniphora rafaeli Brown & Kung, 2007 c g
 Dohrniphora rainbowi Disney, 1990 c g
 Dohrniphora rectangularis  g
 Dohrniphora rectilinearis Liu, 2001 c g
 Dohrniphora recurvata Borgmeier, 1960 c g
 Dohrniphora rhinotermitis Schmitz & Mjoberg, 1924 c g
 Dohrniphora rhynchophora Beyer, 1960 c g
 Dohrniphora rostrata (Enderlein, 1912) c g
 Dohrniphora sarmientoi Brown & Kung, 2007 c g
 Dohrniphora schmitzi Kohl, 1915 c g
 Dohrniphora schroederi Schmitz, 1923 c g
 Dohrniphora scutellaris Borgmeier, 1960 c g
 Dohrniphora sensibilis Borgmeier & Prado, 1975 c g
 Dohrniphora separata  g
 Dohrniphora seriata Kung & Brown, 2006
 Dohrniphora setitibia Malloch, 1925 c g
 Dohrniphora setulipalpis Liu, 2001 c g
 Dohrniphora sexspinosa Kung & Brown, 2006
 Dohrniphora shannoni Borgmeier, 1961 c g
 Dohrniphora sharkeyi Brown & Kung, 2007 c g
 Dohrniphora signata Borgmeier, 1967 c g
 Dohrniphora simplex Borgmeier & Prado, 1975 c g
 Dohrniphora sinaloensis Brown & Kung, 2007 c g
 Dohrniphora sinepigra Brown & Kung, 2007 c g
 Dohrniphora sinopi Prado, 1976 c g
 Dohrniphora sinufemorea Schmitz, 1942 c g
 Dohrniphora sinuosa Borgmeier, 1960 c g
 Dohrniphora smithi Brown & Kung, 2007 c g
 Dohrniphora solomonis Borgmeier, 1961 c g
 Dohrniphora sorora Disney, 2006
 Dohrniphora spriggsi Disney, 1990 c g
 Dohrniphora stenobasalis Brown & Kung, 2007 c g
 Dohrniphora stuckenbergi Disney, 2003 c g
 Dohrniphora subsulcata Borgmeier & Prado, 1975 c g
 Dohrniphora sulcatula Borgmeier, 1960 c g
 Dohrniphora tarsalis Borgmeier, 1969 c g
 Dohrniphora taylori Disney, 1990 c g
 Dohrniphora thailandensis Disney, 2006
 Dohrniphora townesi Brown & Kung, 2007 c g
 Dohrniphora transformata Schmitz, 1915 c g
 Dohrniphora transversa Brown & Kung, 2007 c g
 Dohrniphora triangula  g
 Dohrniphora trigonae Disney, 1995 c g
 Dohrniphora trudiae Disney, 1983 c g
 Dohrniphora utriensis Brown & Kung, 2007 c g
 Dohrniphora ventralis Borgmeier & Prado, 1975 c g
 Dohrniphora vexans Borgmeier & Prado, 1975 c g
 Dohrniphora vorax Schmitz, 1915 c g
 Dohrniphora wangae Brown & Kung, 2007 c g
 Dohrniphora wilkinsoni Brown & Kung, 2007 c g
 Dohrniphora xiei Brown & Kung, 2007 c g
 Dohrniphora yasuniensis Brown & Kung, 2007 c g
 Dohrniphora zambiae Disney, 2003 c g
 Dohrniphora zomerysis Brown & Kung, 2007 c g
 Dohrniphora zophera Disney, 2003 c g

Data sources: i = ITIS, c = Catalogue of Life, g = GBIF, b = Bugguide.net

References

Dohrniphora
Articles created by Qbugbot